Benedict Tan Chi Loong (born 21 November 1967) is a former Singaporean sailor and a doctor. He competed in the Laser event at the 1996 Summer Olympics. Tan was the former president of the Singapore Sailing Federation (SSF) from 2010 to 2018.

Early life 
Tan was born in a Peranakan family with a younger sibling. He studied in Eunos Primary, Ghim Moh Secondary School, and Hwa Chong Junior College.

Sailing 
At the 1994 Asian Games held at Hiroshima, Japan, Tan won the gold medal in the Laser class. In 2010, Tan became the president of the SSF. In 2018, he stepped down from the position.

Sports 
In 2018, Tan was elected as one of the Singapore National Olympic Council's vice president.

References

External links
 

1967 births
Living people
Singaporean male sailors (sport)
Olympic sailors of Singapore
Sailors at the 1996 Summer Olympics – Laser
Place of birth missing (living people)
Asian Games medalists in sailing
Sailors at the 1994 Asian Games
Medalists at the 1994 Asian Games
Asian Games gold medalists for Singapore